Lakshmana, also spelled as Laxmana, is the younger brother of Rama and his loyalist in the Hindu epic Ramayana. He bears the epithets of Saumitra and Ramanuja. He is the twin of Shatrughna.

Legend

Birth and marriage 

King Dasharatha of Ayodhya had three wives: Kausalya, Kaikeyi, and Sumitra. He performed a sacrifice to beget sons and as a result, his queens became pregnant. Lakshmana and his brother Shatrughna were born to Sumitra, while Rama and Bharata were born to Kausalya and Kaikeyi.

In the Puranas, Lakshmana is described as an incarnation of Shesha, the multiple-headed naga (serpent) upon whom rests the preserver deity Vishnu, whose avatar Rama is considered to be.

When sage Vishvamitra asked Rama to kill the demons in the forest, Lakshmana accompanied them and went to Mithila with them. Lakshmana was especially attached to Rama. When Rama married Sita, Lakshmana married Sita's younger sister, Urmila. They had two sons: Angada and Chandraketu.

Later, when Rama was exiled for fourteen years on the insistence of Kaikeyi, Lakshmana left his wife Urmila and joined Rama and Sita in exile.

Rama's exile 
Lakshmana served Rama and Sita reverently during the exile. In Panchavati, Lakshmana also built a hut for Rama and Sita to live in. Lakshmana cut off Ravana's sister Surpanakha's nose in anger when she tried to seduce Rama and insulted Sita. He played an important role in the war with Ravana and slew Ravana's sons Indrajita and Atikaya.

When Sita asked Rama to fetch a magical golden hind for her, Rama asked Lakshmana to stand guard as he sensed danger and evil. The golden hind was in fact the demon Maricha, who distracted Rama. When Rama killed Maricha, he cried out in his own voice for help. Although Lakshmana knew that Rama was invincible and beyond any danger, Sita panicked and frantically ordered Lakshmana to go to Rama's aid immediately. Unable to disobey Sita, Lakshmana drew a perimeter line (Lakshmana Rekha or Lakshmana's line), which Sita must not cross and went in search of Rama. Sita, however, out of compulsion of religious duty and compassion for Ravana, who was disguised as a poor Brahmin, crossed the line to give him alms, following which she was abducted.

During the war between Rama and Ravana, Lakshmana killed Indrajita and Atikaya, who were the sons of Ravana. Before he killed Indrajita, Lakhshmana was wounded daceitfully by Indrajita, and Hanuman's intervention saved him from certain death.

After exile 
After the end of the Lanka war, Rama was crowned King of Kosala, and Bharata became the crown prince. Rama had offered to make Lakshmana the crown prince, but he refused, saying Bharata was elder to him and more deserving of the title. Rama, hearing this, was very pleased and said "O Lakshmana, in this birth, you served me so well and did your duties as a younger brother, so I will do the same in my next birth as your younger brother". Thus, in the next birth, Rama became Krishna and Lakshmana became Balarama, Krishna's elder brother. 

Lakshmana was the one who left Sita in the forests near sage Valmiki's ashram after she expressed her desire to leave the kingdom. Lakshmana remained loyal to his brother and fought against Rama's sons Lava and Kusha later on. 

According to the Uttara Kanda, Lakshmana had ruled over Karupada; which was inherited by his elder son, Angada; whilst Lakshmana's younger son, Chandraketu had inherited Mallya, with its capital Chandrakanti being commissioned by Rama.

Renunciation of life
Sage Durvasa appeared at Rama's doorstep, and seeing Lakshmana guarding the door, demanded an audience with Rama. At the time, Rama was having a private conversation with Yama. Before the conversation began, Yama gave Rama strict instructions that their dialogue was to remain confidential, and anyone who entered the room was to be relieved of their life. Rama agreed and entrusted Lakshmana with the duty of guarding his door. When Durvasa made his demand, Lakshmana politely refused. The sage grew angry and threatened to curse all of Ayodhya if Lakshmana did not immediately inform Rama of his arrival. Lakshmana, in a dilemma, decided it would be better that he alone die to save all of Ayodhya from falling under Durvasa's curse and so interrupted Rama's meeting to inform him of the sage's arrival. Durvasa cursed him that he should go to heaven alive. Rama quickly concluded his meeting with Yama and received the sage with due courtesy. In order to fulfil his brother's promise, Lakshmana went to the banks of the river Sarayu, resolved on giving up the world by drowning himself in the Sarayu. From there, Indra removed Lakshmana from the water and took him alive to heaven.

In popular culture
Lakshmana was depicted by the Ramayana as a man with unwavering loyalty, love and commitment to his elder brother, through times of joy and adversity alike.

Bandhavgarh Fort at Madhya Pradesh (bandhav as brother, garh as fort) was said to have been given by Rama to his brother Lakshmana to keep watch on Lanka.

Military officers given the rank equivalent of admirals in navies in the Malay Archipelago, including Malaysia and Indonesia, are titled "Lakshmana" after the figure.

Jainism

Lakshmana is referred to as Vasudeva in the Jain Ramayana. According to the Jain Ramayana, it was Lakshmana who killed Ravana, not Rama.

Gallery

References

External links 
 

Characters in the Ramayana
Hindu gods
Salakapurusa
Solar dynasty